Arthur J. Katzman (1903 – 1993) was an American politician and attorney who served as a member of the New York City Council representing the 29th district, which includes Forest Hills, Rego Park, Kew Gardens and parts of Maspeth, Richmond Hill and Elmhurst.

Early life and education 
Katzman was born on September 21, 1903, in Belarus and emigrated to the United States with his family when he was five. Their first home in New York City was in Brownsville, Brooklyn. Katzman graduated from Brooklyn Law School.

Career 
After graduating from law school, Katzman established a law practice in Forest Hills, Queens. Katzman served as a member of the New York City Council from 1962 until his retirement in 1991. Katzman ran as an insurgent Reform Democrat against incumbent George J. Schneider.

Among his first achievements in office was legislation that provided funding for Yellowstone Municipal Park, a playground that was later named after Katzman. At the time of his retirement, he was the oldest serving member of the City Council.

Death

He died on August 29, 1993, at his daughter's home in Mountain View, California.

References 

New York City Council members
Brooklyn Law School alumni
Jewish American people in New York (state) politics
1903 births
1993 deaths
20th-century American politicians
People from Brownsville, Brooklyn
Politicians from Brooklyn
20th-century American Jews